Requiem for Billy the Kid is a 2006 French documentary biographical western film directed by Anne Feinsilber and starring Kris Kristofferson and Arthur H as Billy the Kid. It was released at the 2006 Cannes Film Festival.

References

External links
 
 

2006 films
2006 Western (genre) films
2006 documentary films
2000s biographical films
French documentary films
French biographical films
French Western (genre) films
Biographical films about Billy the Kid
Films shot in New Mexico
2000s American films
2000s French films